The Baltic Cup was an ice hockey tournament held during 2004–05 season. The three Baltic nations, Estonia, Latvia, and Lithuania, participated, and Poland also sent a team. There were four rounds of the tournament, one in each country.

2004–05 season 
Four three-day tournaments were staged between August 27, 2004 and February 7, 2005, so that each of the four participants were able to host a tournament.

The tournaments were held in the Estonian capital of Tallinn from August 27–29, 2004, the Lithuanian city of Elektrenai from November 5–7, 2004, the Polish city of Gdańsk from December 17–19, 2004, and the Latvian city of Ogre from February 5–7, 2005.

Stoczniowiec Gdańsk won the first three tournaments and had already wrapped up the competition heading into the fourth tournament. ASK/Ogre won the final tournament.

References

External links
Season on hockeyarchives.info

Defunct multi-national ice hockey leagues in Europe
1